The 1964 North Dakota Fighting Sioux football team, also known as the Nodaks, was an American football team that represented the University of North Dakota in the North Central Conference (NCC) during the 1964 NCAA College Division football season. In its eighth year under head coach Marvin C. Helling, the team compiled an 8–1 record (5–1 against NCC opponents), tied for the NCC championship, and outscored opponents by a total of 199 to 110. The team played its home games at Memorial Stadium in Grand Forks, North Dakota.

Schedule

References

North Dakota
North Dakota Fighting Hawks football seasons
North Central Conference football champion seasons
North Dakota Fighting Sioux football